Edmund G. Booz (1824–1870) was an American importer and liquor merchant whose name has been incorrectly associated with the origin or popularity of the word booze. The log cabin shaped decanter associated with his liquor store in Philadelphia became a highly sought after collector's item and his name would be revived in a 1950s Kentucky bourbon brand.

Early life
Edmund Booz was born in 1824 in Bucks County, Pennsylvania. His parents were William and Alice Green Hewson Booz, both of them born in Bucks County. His father, William, was a small landowner and farmer.

Importer and Merchant
The first mention of Edmund in Philadelphia is as a clerk and merchant at 87 South Front Street near Penn's Landing in 1855. In 1860, he moved his business around the block to 120 Walnut Street and became an importer and liquor dealer. His landlord was a Portugese Madeira wine importer Fortunato Joaquim Figueira, Baron of Conceição.

Booz' business grew in sales and reputation and in 1864, he doubled the size of his facility by expanding into the space behind his at 15 Granite Street. This would have allowed him the space to expand his spirits collection and begin rectifying whiskey for his customers.

There has long been an assumption that E. G. Booz distilled his own whiskey, but there is no evidence to support this. Jesse Godley, his original landlord on South Front Street is a likely source, as he owned Federally bonded warehouses on Front Street.

After his death in 1870, his store's contents were auctioned off.  The store contained 500 packages of domestic and imported liquors, horses, carriages, harness, fixtures, stocks, and personal property. There is no mention of distilling equipment.

Log Cabin Decanter 
Much of the mystery and speculation around Edmund G. Booz comes from a log cabin shaped decanter that originated out of a partnership between Booz and his neighbor Whitney Glassworks at 118 Walnut Street.

During the 1850s, glass was expensive and whiskey was rarely sold in bottles. Instead, customers would bring their own jugs from home or could buy refillable jugs from the grocer or rectifier. Booz went one step further offering a uniquely styled log cabin shaped bottle that featured the name of his business and location on Walnut Street.

The log cabin shape was inspired by William Henry Harrison, whose 1840 campaign for President of the United States positioned him as the "Log Cabin" candidate versus his competitor Martin Van Buren, who was seen as more aristocratic. This decanter has helped fuel the idea that E. G. Booz was a distiller and that he provided this whiskey during Harrison's campaign, but Edmund would have been only 16 years old at the time and there is no evidence to support it. The 1840 date embossed in the glass was only a reference to the Harrison campaign, not the origin of the whiskey.

Family
Edmund Booz married Catherine, a woman 12 years his junior who had been born in Philadelphia.  They had two sons, Charles, born in 1857 and Andrew, born the following year.

Death
On July 19, 1870, a dehydrated Edmund Booz collapsed at his 1310 Brown Street, suffering from the effects of sunstroke. He died later that evening with the official cause of death being congestion of the brain. He was buried in Laurel Hill Cemetery, Philadelphia. Buried with him is one of his sons, Charles, a railroad conductor, who died at only 30 years of age in 1883.

Kentucky Straight Bourbon Whiskey
The 1950s were an era when bourbon sales were declining, distilleries like Jim Beam and others began releasing their bourbons in collectable decanters. To take advantage of this, a Bardstown, Kentucky distillery established the E. G. Booz Distilling Company and released a log cabin decanter that  took inspiration from the original Whitney Glassworks design.

They advertised E. G. Booz as "a name so famous, it has become part of the English Language," and claimed that 114 years before (using the 1840 date) E. G. Booz "owned a small distillery where hand-made whiskey of rare excellence was produced." The spirit inside was a Kentucky Straight Bourbon Whiskey, rather than what was likely a Pennsylvania spirit in the original Booz decanters from the 1860s.

References

American businesspeople